Prisoner Number Seven (German: Achtung! - Kriminalpolizei! or Gefangene Nr. 7, Hungarian: Rabmadár) is a 1929 German-Hungarian drama film directed by Lajos Lázár and Paul Sugar and starring Hans Adalbert Schlettow, Lissy Arna and Charlotte Susa.

Cast
 Hans Adalbert Schlettow as Jenõ, szállodai pincér  
 Lissy Arna as Rabnõ  
 Charlotte Susa as Börtönorvosnõ  
 El' Dura as Maláji táncosnõ  
 Ida Turay as Madárka  
 Mariska H. Balla as Szállodaigazgtónõ  
 Olga Kerekgyarto as új szobalány  
 Szidi Rákosi as Börtönõr

References

Bibliography
 Prawer, S.S. Between Two Worlds: The Jewish Presence in German and Austrian Film, 1910-1933. Berghahn Books, 2005.

External links

1929 films
Hungarian silent feature films
Films of the Weimar Republic
German silent feature films
German black-and-white films
German crime drama films
Hungarian crime drama films
1929 crime drama films
Silent drama films
1920s German films